Martin Smith is a former Professor of Robotics at Middlesex University in north London, UK. He is also a former President of the Cybernetics Society in the UK (1999 - 2020).

Smith was awarded Freedom of the City of London, and was awarded the Public Awareness of Physics Award by the Institute of Physics.

Television appearances

Smith has appeared on many television programmes: as a technical presenter on the BBC television programme Techno Games  and as a judge on Robot Wars from the third series having previously competed in the first series. He was a judge and programme consultant on Channel 4's Scrapheap Challenge  and technical presenter on Granada TV's Mutant Machines. He has also appeared on Tomorrow's World, Tomorrow's World Live at the NEC, and the Royal Institution Christmas Lectures series entitled The Rise of Robots.

Editorships

Smith is a member of the editorial boards of Kybernetes: The International Journal of Cybernetics and Systems, The International Journal of Advanced Robotic Systems, The International Journal of Applied Systemic Studies, the International Journal of General Systems, and The International Journal of Social Robotics. He is a Director of the World Organisation of Systems and Cybernetics.

Former posts

He has held posts as Visiting Research Professor in Robotics at the Open University, Professor at the University of Central England UK, (now Birmingham City University) and at the University of East London (UK) where he was founder and Head of the Mobile Robots Research Unit.

References

External links
Biography - the Cybernetics Society

Academics of the Open University
Cyberneticists
Living people
Year of birth missing (living people)
Fellows of the Institute of Physics
Fellows of the Royal Astronomical Society